ZooL is a defunct Swedish band that was created by guitarist Henrik Flyman as a platform for classic hard rock. ZooL released one album 2002 and has not been heard of since, though it was never officially declared extinct. Flyman himself is today active in Evil Masquerade. Daniel Flores returned to Flyman's side 2008 on Evil Masquerade's fourth studio album Fade To Black.

Lineup
Henrik Flyman - guitars
Martin - vocals
Daniel Flores - drums
Stefan Edström - bass
Andreas Lindahl - keyboard

Guest artist:
Richard Andersson - keyboard

Discography
ZooL (2002)

References

Swedish hard rock musical groups